Three Rivers Community College (TRCC) is a public community college in Norwich, Connecticut. It was formed in 1992 by the merger of Mohegan Community College and Thames Valley State Technical College and is named after the three major rivers in the region: the Shetucket, the Yantic and the Thames. It is accredited by the New England Commission of Higher Education.

Campus
The College was split between the Mohegan and Thames Valley campuses on opposite sides of Norwich. In 2003, the state legislature approved funding to consolidate the College at the Thames Valley campus. In 2009, the college finally consolidated into the one campus on New London Turnpike. There are also two off-campus instructional centers, one at the nearby Naval Submarine Base, the other at Ella Grasso Technical School in Groton.

Three Rivers Middle College
Three Rivers Community College is also the home of Three Rivers Middle College (TRMC), a dual-enrollment magnet high school.  TRMC students combine the last two years of high school with up to one full year of college courses, giving them a head start on their associate degrees.

References

External links
 Official website

Buildings and structures in Norwich, Connecticut
Community colleges in Connecticut
Educational institutions established in 1992
Universities and colleges in New London County, Connecticut
1992 establishments in Connecticut